Moridarow, also rendered as Muridarow, may refer to:
 Moridarow-e Bala
 Moridarow-e Pain